The Premio 40 Principales for Best Spanish Video is an honor presented annually at Los Premios 40 Principales.

References

Los Premios 40 Principales